Davidenko is a surname, derived from the given name David. Notable people with the surname include:

 Vassili Davidenko (born 1970), Russian-American cyclist
 Viktor Davidenko (1914–1983), Soviet military engineer

See also
 
 Davydenko

Patronymic surnames
Surnames from given names